The Bad Mothers or The Evil Mothers is an oil on canvas painting by Giovanni Segantini, created in 1894, now in the Österreichische Galerie Belvedere, in Vienna. It is the latest of four works in which he keeps returning to the motif of women in trees. The other three were The Fruit of Life (1889), The Punishment of Lust (1891) and The Angel of Life (1894) and together they were his first Symbolist works.

References

1894 paintings
Paintings in the collection of the Belvedere, Vienna
Symbolist paintings
Paintings by Giovanni Segantini
Women in art